Cardisoma crassum, known as the mouthless crab, is a species of terrestrial crab found in the coastal tropical eastern Pacific from Baja California to Peru. It has a purplish-blue shell, red legs and white main pincer. Cardisoma crassum is common among mangrove roots, where it builds its burrow. It also occasionally occurs on the driest part of the channel banks and flats".

References

Grapsoidea
Terrestrial crustaceans
Arthropods of Central America
Crustaceans described in 1870
Taxa named by Sidney Irving Smith